Urbanus was a Roman usurper.

History
Urbanus declared himself emperor in either 271 or 272 AD, during the reign of Aurelian. He likely staged his revolt in Dalmatia. He was quickly defeated. He is possibly fictional.

References

Books

External links
 "Urbanus", s.v. "Aurelian", De Imperatoribus Romanis site

271 deaths
3rd-century Roman usurpers
Year of birth unknown
Romans from unknown gentes